Kamlesh Sawant is an Indian actor who works in Hindi and Marathi films. He is most known for the movies Force, Bhoothnath Returns, and Drishyam.

Filmography

References

External links

Male actors from Mumbai
Living people
1974 births
Male actors in Marathi cinema
21st-century Indian male actors